National Geographic Prehistoric Mammals is a book by Alan Turner and illustrated by Mauricio Anton. It was published in 2004 by National Geographic.

Animals Featured

Mammals
 Adapis parisiensis
 Adcrocuta (mentioned)
 Aelurodon ferox
 Aepycamelus major
 Agerinia
 Agriotherium (unidentified)
 Ampelomeryx
 Amphicyon major
 Amphimachairodus giganteus (identified by its synonym Machairodus palanderi)
 Amphiorycteropus depereti (identified by its synonym Orycteropus depereti)
 Amphiorycteropus gaudryi (mentioned, identified by its synonym Orycteropus gaudryi)
 Anancus arvernensis Anchitherium aurelianense Andrewsarchus Anisodon (identified by its synonym Chalicotherium grande)
 Archaeopteropus Archaeotherium mortoni Arctodus simus Arsinoitherium zitteli Arvernoceros Astrapotherium Australopithecus afarensis Australopithecus africanus Barbourofelis (unidentified, seen on the cover of the book)
 Barylambda (identified as a Pantodont)
 Basilosaurus cetoides Bison menneri Bison priscus Bison voigtstedtensis Borhyaena Borophagus (mentioned)
 Bunolistriodon Chalicotherium goldfussi Chasmaporthetes lunensis Coelodonta antiquitatis Cranioceras Croizetoceros Deinogalerix koenigswaldi Deinotherium bozasi (mentioned)
 Deinotherium giganteum Diadiaphorus (mentioned)
 Didelphis (mentioned)
 Dinofelis barlowi Diprotodon optatum Dolichopithecus (misspelled as Dolicopithecus)
 Doedicurus Dryopithecus laietanus Ekorus Elephas (mentioned)
 Enaliarctos mealsi Entelodon deguilhemi (identified by its synonym Archaeotherium deguilhemi)
 Eohippus (mentioned)
 Eomaia Epicyon haydeni Epicyon saevus Equus altidens Equus ferus ferus (identified as Wild Horses)
 Equus stenonis Eurhinodelphis bossi Gazellospira Glossotherium chapadmalense (identified as ground sloths)
 Glyptotherium arizonae Gomphotherium angustidens Halitherium schinzi Hassianycteris Hemicyon sansaniensis (mentioned)
 Herpestes Hesperocyon gregarius Hexaprotodon Hipparion Hippopotamus amphibius (mentioned)
 Hippopotamus gorgops Hippotherium primigenium Hispanotherium Homo antecessor Homo erectus Homo neanderthalensis Homo sapiens Homotherium latidens Hoplophoneus mentalis Hyainailurus (misspelled as Hyainailouros)
 Hyaenodon dubius Hyracotherium (mentioned)
 Icaronycteris index Kenyanthropus (mentioned)
 Kobus (unidentified)
 Kubanochoerus gigas Leptictidium nasutum Leptorycteropus Machaeroides eothen Machairodus (mentioned)
 Macrauchenia patachonica Mammut americanum Mammuthus primigenius Megacerops coloradensis (briefly identified by its synonym Brontotherium)
 Megaloceros giganteus Megantereon cultridens Megapedetes pentadactylus Megatherium americanum Mesohippus bairdi Metaxytherium (mentioned)
 Miotragocerus Miracinonyx inexpectatus Mylodon (scientific name misspelled as "Mylodon darwinii")
 Myorycteropus Nemegtbaatar Nimravides Nimravus brachyops (misspelled as "N. brachiops")
 Notharctus tenebrosus Nothrotheriops shastensis Nyanzachoerus Nyctereutes donnezani Orohippus agilis Orycteropus afer (mentioned)
 Pachycrocuta brevirostris Pakicetus attocki Palaeochiropteryx Palaeoloxodon recki (identified by its synonym Elephas recki)
 Palaeotherium magnum Paleoparadoxia tabatai Panthera leo Panthera spelaea Papio (mentioned)
 Paracamelus Paraceratherium transouralicum (identified by its synonym Indricotherium transouralicum)
 Paraglyptodon (identified as Glyptodonts)
 Paranthropus boisei Paranthropus robustus Paroodectes Pelorovis antiquus (mentioned)
 Pelorovis oldwayensis Peradectes Phenacodus matthewi Phoberomys (mentioned)
 Phyllotillon Plesiadapis tricuspidens Plesictis Potamotherium (mentioned)
 Proailurus (mentioned)
 Proconsul africanus Procoptodon (mentioned)
 Prodeinotherium bavaricum (mentioned, identified by its synonym Deinotherium bavaricum)
 Propalaeotherium hassiacum Proviverra Pseudaelurus (mentioned)
 Pseudoltinomys Purgatorius (mentioned)
 Pyrotherium (identified as a Pyrothere)
 Rangifer tarandus Rodhocetus balochistanensis Simosthenurus Sinopa Smilodon fatalis Smilodon gracilis Smilodon populator Stephanorhinus hemitoechus Sthenurus Stylinodon (identified as a Taeniodont)
 Sus scrofa Synthetoceras Teleoceras (mentioned)
 Thalassictis Theridomys (unidentified)
 Theropithecus brumpti Thylacinus cynocephalus Thylacoleo carnifex Thylacosmilus Toxodon platensis Tragoportax Tylocephalonyx Uintatherium Ursus spelaeus Vincelestes Viverra leakeyi Xenosmilus "Mammut" borsoniNon-Mammals
 Andalgalornis Cheirogaster Cynognathus Inostrancevia Kannemeyeria Megazostrodon Otodus megalodon (referred to by its synonym Carcharodon megalodon)
 Rubidgea Thrinaxodon (mentioned)
 Triceratops Varanus prisca''

Paleontology books
2004 non-fiction books
National Geographic Society books